Anthony Elechi (born August 10, 1993) is an American professional basketball player for the Tromsø Storm of the BLNO. His first pro contract was with the Glasgow Rocks in the BBL for the 2016–2017 season. He spent the 2017–2018 season playing for Passlab Yamagata Wyverns in Japan. He played for Surrey Scorchers, returning to the BBL for the 2018–2019 season. Elechi spent the 2019–20 season in the Spanish LEB Plata for CP La Roda, averaging 9.7 points and 5.2 rebounds per game. On July 28, 2020, Elechi signed with the Tromsø Storm.

References

1993 births
Living people
American expatriate basketball people in Japan
American expatriate basketball people in Norway
American expatriate basketball people in Spain
American expatriate basketball people in the United Kingdom
Glasgow Rocks players
Morehead State Eagles men's basketball players
Passlab Yamagata Wyverns players
American men's basketball players
Forwards (basketball)